Christian Bordé (born 15 March 1943) is a French physicist. He has been a member of the French Academy of Sciences since December 2008.

Biography 
Emeritus research director at the CNRS, he is known for his work in the field of ultra-high resolution laser spectroscopy. He invented and developed saturation spectroscopy, which he used to study many new and fundamental effects in molecular physics. Its name is attached to the design of a whole class of atomic interferometers based on the recoil effect, which make it possible to produce optical clocks, measure atomic masses and probe the properties of space-time. In particular, he demonstrated that these interferometers allowed very accurate measurement of the fields of inertia. The proximity of its work to the field of metrology has led it to preside on several occasions, on behalf of the French Academy of Sciences, over the meetings of the General Conference on Weights and Measures, the executive organ of the Metre Convention.

He is a founding member of the French Academy of Technologies and Chevalier of the Légion d'honneur.

He is the grandson of engineer and aeronaut Paul-Alphonse-Barthélémy Bordé, inventor of a compass system for airships patented in 1911 and founder of the company of the same name.

See also 

 Ramsey interferometry

References

Members of the French Academy of Sciences
French physicists
1943 births
Living people
Research directors of the French National Centre for Scientific Research